Poliaček is a Slovak surname. Notable people with the surname include:

 Miroslav Poliaček (born 1983), Slovak footballer
 Pavol Poliaček (born 1988), Slovak footballer

Slovak-language surnames